The 2019 Paris–Tours was the 113th edition of the Paris–Tours cycling classic. The race was held on 13 October 2019 as part of the 2019 UCI Europe Tour as a 1.HC-ranked event. Jelle Wallays, who had previously won this race in 2014, went solo and achieved his second victory, ahead of Niki Terpstra and Oliver Naesen, who had finished second and fourth respectively the year before.

Teams
Twenty-three teams, of which seven were UCI WorldTeams, fourteen were UCI Professional Continental teams, and two were UCI Continental teams, started the race. Of the 156 riders who entered the race, only 64 riders finished, while 4 riders did not start.

UCI WorldTeams

 
 
 
 
 
 
 

UCI Professional Continental Teams

 
 
 
 
 
 
 
 
 
 
 
 
 
 

UCI Continental Teams

Results

References

External links
Official website

Paris-Tours
Paris–Tours
Paris-Tours
Paris-Tours